Stevan Edward Pearce (born August 24, 1947) is an American businessman and politician who served as the U.S. representative for  from 2003 to 2009 and from 2011 to 2019. He is a member of the Republican Party and was his party's unsuccessful nominee in the 2018 New Mexico gubernatorial election. On December 8, 2018, Pearce was elected Chair of the New Mexico Republican Party, replacing Ryan Cangiolosi. He was re-elected in December 2020.

Early life, education, and business career
Pearce was born in Lamesa, Texas and raised in Hobbs, New Mexico. He attended college at New Mexico State University in Las Cruces, having earned a Bachelor of Business Administration in economics. Afterward, he received a Master of Business Administration from Eastern New Mexico University in Portales. While at New Mexico State University, Pearce was elected president of the student body.

He served in the Vietnam War as a C-130 pilot in the United States Air Force. Pearce flew over 518 hours of combat flight and 77 hours of combat support. He was awarded the Distinguished Flying Cross and two Air Medals, as well as seven other military medals and four exceptional service awards. Upon returning to the United States, Pearce was assigned to the Strategic Air Command at Blytheville Air Force Base, Arkansas. He was honorably discharged from the U.S. Air Force with the rank of captain.

Pearce and his wife owned and operated Lea Fishing Tools, an oilfield services company in Hobbs, New Mexico, until they sold the business in 2003 to Key Energy Services for $12 million.

New Mexico House of Representatives

Elections
Pearce was elected to the New Mexico House of Representatives in 1996 and re-elected in 1998, both times unopposed.

Committee assignments
He was elected as Republican Caucus Chairman and served on the Appropriations Committee.

2000 U.S. Senate election 

Pearce ran for the United States Senate in the seat held by longtime incumbent Democrat Jeff Bingaman. He lost in the Republican primary to former  U.S. Congressman Bill Redmond 60% to 22%.

U.S. House of Representatives

Elections

2002 

Eleven term incumbent Republican U.S. Representative Joe Skeen decided to retire. In the Republican primary, Pearce ran and won the five candidate field with a plurality of 35%. His closest challenger was rancher and businessman Edward R. Tinsley, owner of the K-Bob's Steakhouse, who got 27%. Coincidentally, both Pearce and Tinsley were reared in the small West Texas city of Lamesa in Dawson County. In the general election, Pearce defeated Democratic State Senator John Arthur Smith 56% to 44%.

2004 

Pearce won re-election to a second term against Democratic State Representative Gary King 60% to 40%.

2006 

Pearce won re-election to a third term against Democratic pastor Al Kissling 59% to 40%.

2008 

Pearce ran for the open Senate seat of retiring six term Republican US Senator Pete Domenici. He did not run for reelection to the 2nd District, making New Mexico's 2nd District an open seat race. Democratic business owner Harry Teague defeated Republican restaurateur Edward R. Tinsley 56% to 44%.

2010 

On August 1, 2009, Pearce announced his intention to take back his former congressional seat. On June 1, 2010, he won the Republican primary without any serious challengers. He was endorsed in the race by former vice presidential nominee Sarah Palin. He drew criticism from local media after an event in Los Lunas where he refused to say whether he believes Barack Obama is a natural-born U.S. citizen.

Pearce defeated incumbent Democrat Harry Teague 55% to 45%.

2012 

Pearce won reelection for a 5th term to Congress and 2nd consecutive term in 2012. He defeated Democratic former educator Evelyn Madrid Erhard 59% to 41%. During the campaign, Pearce's largest donors were Mack Energy Corporation and Yates Petroleum. Pearce received $209,600 from the oil and gas sector during the campaign cycle.

2014 

Pearce won re-election against Democrat Roxanne "Rocky" Lara with 64% of the vote.

2016 

Pearce won re-election against Democrat Merrie Lee Soules with 62% of the vote.

Pearce did not seek re-election to the House of Representatives in 2018, instead running unsuccessfully for Governor of New Mexico.

Tenure
Plagiarism
In 2005, Pearce was accused of having plagiarized articles from think tanks like the Heritage Foundation. The articles were published under Pearce's name in small papers throughout New Mexico. His press secretary, Jim Burns, admitted to having plagiarized the articles himself without Pearce's knowledge, and quickly resigned.

Committee assignments
 Committee on Financial Services
 Subcommittee on Capital Markets and Government-Sponsored Enterprises
 Subcommittee on Financial Institutions and Consumer Credit
 Subcommittee on Oversight and Investigations

Caucus memberships
 Co-Chair of the Border Security Caucus
 Vice-Chairman of the Native American Caucus
 Vice-Chairman of the Sportsman Caucus
 Freedom Caucus 
 Republican Study Committee
 Congressional Hispanic Conference {associate member}
 Congressional Constitution Caucus
Congressional Western Caucus

2008 U.S. Senate election 

On October 16, 2007, Pearce announced he would run for the Republican nomination to replace Pete Domenici in the U.S. Senate.

Fellow Republican Representative Heather Wilson had previously declared her candidacy in that race. In late October 2007, Pearce made 130,000 automated phone calls to justify his opposition to the State Children's Health Insurance Program (SCHIP) bill that would have provided health benefit to children, which the Wilson campaign claimed "Pearce violated House ethics by urging those he called to contact him through his official, non-campaign phone number or check out his official, non-campaign Web site."

In March 2008, Pearce garnered 55% of the vote at the Republican pre-primary nominating convention. He narrowly won the June 3, 2008 Republican primary.

Pearce faced fellow U.S. Representative Tom Udall, a Democrat who represented New Mexico's 3rd congressional district, and lost in the general election, 61% to 39%.

2018 gubernatorial election 

In July 2017, Pearce announced his run for Governor of New Mexico. to replace the term-limited Republican governor Susana Martinez. He ran unopposed in the Republican primary. Pearce lost to Democratic nominee Michelle Lujan Grisham, a fellow New Mexico U.S. Representative from the 1st district in the general election on November 6, 2018.

Political positions

Barack Obama citizenship conspiracy theories 
In 2010, Pearce expressed skepticism that President Barack Obama was born in the United States.

Environment 
Pearce has questioned the scientific consensus on climate change. He said that "in fact the last 17 years there has not been global warming" and that "there are 31,000 scientists who say that human action is not causing the global warming at all".

Pearce had been a long-time advocate of oil and gas drilling in Otero Mesa.

2020 election 
After Joe Biden defeated Donald Trump in the 2020 presidential election, Pearce and the New Mexico GOP cast doubt on the validity of the election results. Soon after the election was called for Biden, Pearce called for donations so Trump can challenge the results. In late 2020, Pearce supported the Trump campaign's efforts to invalidate Biden's victory in New Mexico, falsely claiming that massive voter fraud occurred. In his podcast, Pearce aired numerous conspiracy theories about the election, claiming he wanted to investigate possible "anomalies". In December 2020, Pearce issued a statement supporting the Texas v. Pennsylvania lawsuit aiming to overturn the certification of Biden's victory in multiple states, citing false claims of fraud.

On January 7, 2021, Pearce drew criticism when he claimed that alleged irregularities in the election "tarnished" democracy, soon after Biden's electoral victory was certified by Congress. On January 9, Pearce tweeted that Trump "will be our President FOREVER and no one can take that away from us." The tweet was soon deleted but Pearce defended his post, saying that Trump's false claims of fraud were legitimate and insisted that there was massive voting irregularities in the election.

Personal life
Pearce has been married to his wife Cynthia for over 20 years. In 2013, Pearce published a memoir called Just Fly the Plane, Stupid!. It received attention because Pearce controversially wrote in the memoir that a wife should "voluntarily submit" to her husband, just as the husband should "lovingly lead and sacrifice".

Pearce attends Taylor Memorial Baptist Church, a Southern Baptist church in Hobbs.

References

External links
 
 
 

|-

|-

|-

|-

|-

|-

1947 births
21st-century American politicians
Activists from Texas
American memoirists
United States Air Force personnel of the Vietnam War
Baptists from Texas
Businesspeople from New Mexico
Christians from New Mexico
Living people
Republican Party members of the New Mexico House of Representatives
Military personnel from New Mexico
Military personnel from Texas
People from Hobbs, New Mexico
People from Lamesa, Texas
Protestants from New Mexico
Recipients of the Air Medal
Recipients of the Distinguished Flying Cross (United States)
Republican Party members of the United States House of Representatives from New Mexico
United States Air Force officers
Writers from New Mexico
Writers from Texas
State political party chairs of New Mexico
Candidates in the 2018 United States elections